The third season of the American superhero television series The Boys, the first series in the franchise based on the comic book series of the same name written by Garth Ennis and Darick Robertson, was developed for television by American writer and television producer Eric Kripke. The season is produced by Sony Pictures Television in association with Point Grey Pictures, Original Film, Kripke Enterprises, Kickstart Entertainment and KFL Nightsky Productions.

The show's third season stars Karl Urban, Jack Quaid, Antony Starr, Erin Moriarty, Dominique McElligott, Jessie T. Usher, Laz Alonso, Chace Crawford, Tomer Capone, Karen Fukuhara, Nathan Mitchell, Colby Minifie, Claudia Doumit and Jensen Ackles. Taking place a year after the events of the previous season, the story follows the titular Boys now working for Victoria Neuman's Bureau of Superhero Affairs to apprehend problematic Supes, having been at peace with the Seven. However, the conflict is resumed once Butcher begins to investigate the truth about the apparent death of Soldier Boy, one of Vought's first American superheroes, with the hope of killing Homelander for good. Meanwhile, Homelander's mental stability begins to deteriorate as Vought attempts to restrict his power, while other Seven members such as Starlight and Queen Maeve assist the Boys in their plots against him.

The season was announced ahead of the second-season premiere, on July 23, 2020, at the aftershow hosted by Aisha Tyler for the 2020 San Diego Comic-Con@Home. The show was released in a weekly basis on streaming service Amazon Prime Video, premiering its first three episodes on June 3, 2022, while the rest ran until July 8, 2022. The season has received critical praise from critics for its screenplay, dark humor, action sequences, character development, storyline, and performances, particularly Urban, Starr, and Ackles. On June 10, 2022, the series was renewed for a fourth season.

Episodes

Cast and characters

Main

 Karl Urban as William "Billy" Butcher
 Luca Villacis as teen Butcher
 Joshua Zaharia as young Butcher
 Jack Quaid as Hugh "Hughie" Campbell Jr.
 Antony Starr as John / Homelander
 Erin Moriarty as Annie January / Starlight
 Maya Misaljevic as young Annie January
 Dominique McElligott as Maggie Shaw / Queen Maeve
 Jessie T. Usher as Reggie Franklin / A-Train
 Laz Alonso as Marvin T. "Mother's" Milk / MM
 Elias Leon Leacock as young Marvin T. Milk
 Chace Crawford as Kevin Moskowitz / The Deep
 Tomer Capone as Serge / Frenchie
 Karen Fukuhara as Kimiko Miyashiro / The Female
 Nathan Mitchell as Earving / Black Noir
 Fritzy-Klevans Destine as young Earving / Black Noir
 Colby Minifie as Ashley Barrett
 Claudia Doumit as Victoria "Vic" Neuman / Nadia
 Elisa Paszt as young Nadia
 Jensen Ackles as Ben / Soldier Boy

Recurring
 Giancarlo Esposito as Stanford "Stan" Edgar
 Justiin Davis as young Stan Edgar
 Laila Robins as Grace Mallory
 Sarah Swire as young Grace Mallory
 Cameron Crovetti as Ryan Butcher
 Katy Breier as Cassandra Schwartz
 Miles Gaston Villanueva as Alex / Supersonic
 Luca Oriel as young Alex / Drummer Boy
 Matthew Edison as Cameron Coleman 
 Matthew Gorman as Todd
 Liyou Abere as Janine
 Laurie Holden as Crimson Countess
 Sabrina Saudin as Also Ashley
 Katia Winter as Nina "Little Nina" Namenko
 Nick Wechsler as Blue Hawk
 Tyler Williams as Yevgenny
 Frances Turner as Monique
 Jack Doolan as Tommy TNT 
 Kristin Booth as Tessa TNT
 Jack Fulton as Lenny Butcher
 Christian Keyes as Nathan Franklin
 Sean Patrick Flanery as Gunpowder
 Gattlin Griffith as young Gunpowder
 Jim Beaver as Robert "Bob" Singer
 Ryan Blakely as Mindstorm 
 Aya Cash as Klara Risinger / Liberty / Stormfront

Guest
 Simon Pegg as Hugh Campbell Sr.
 Malcolm Barrett as Seth Reed
 Shantel VanSanten as Becca Butcher (voice)
 Brett Geddes as Termite
 Kyle Mac as Tony 
 Jasmin Husain as Silver Kincaid
 Abigail Whitney as Moonshadow 
 Ann Cusack as Donna January
 Jordana Lajoie as Cherie Sinclair
 Joel Labelle as Swatto 
 Jasmin Geljo as Oligarch
 Kumail Nanjiani as Vik
 Paul Reiser as The Legend
 Graham Gauthier as Lamar Bishop
 Eric Bauza as Buster Beaver (voice)
 Grey Griffin as Two Birds (voice)
 Nicola Correia-Damude as Elena

Billy Zane, Charlize Theron, Seth Rogen, Patton Oswalt, Josh Gad, Mila Kunis, Ashton Kutcher, Elizabeth Banks, Aisha Tyler, and Rose Byrne cameo as fictionalised version of themselves, with Zane and Theron respectively portraying Alastair Adana and Stormfront in fictional films within the series in "Payback" and "The Only Man In The Sky", and Rogen portraying himself as SupePorn.com patron "SirCumsALot779" in "The Last Time to Look on This World of Lies", with the others appearing in the opening scene of "Herogasm" in a parody of Gal Gadot's COVID-19 lockdown celebrity supergroup cover of "Imagine". Jaz Sinclair appears in a photograph in "The Only Man In The Sky" as Marie Moreau, ahead of starring as her in the spin-off series Gen V.

Production

Development
The third season was announced on July 23, 2020, ahead of the second-season premiere, at the aftershow hosted by Aisha Tyler for the 2020 San Diego Comic-Con@Home. On October 16, 2020, the season's first episode was revealed to be titled "Payback". Eric Kripke confirmed that the sixth episode of the season would be adapting the comic book miniseries Herogasm, which will be taking the same name and will focus on the superhero orgy festivals. Kripke confirmed that Soldier Boy will be different from the comics, revealing that instead of being depicted as a superhero who has yearly sex with Homelander in an attempt to gain membership in The Seven, he will be portrayed as the "Homelander before Homelander". Kripke also revealed that Soldier Boy won't be innocent like he is depicted in the comics and instead he will be portrayed as someone worse than Homelander. Laz Alonso, revealed that the third season would be three times bloodier than the previous season, revealing that they used three and half gallons of fake blood, compared that the previous season only used less than a gallon of blood. On May 17, 2022, it was confirmed that the superhero team Payback would be making their live-action debut on the season, with several superheroes being introduced in the show. The new heroes aside from Soldier Boy would be Crimson Countess, Swatto, TNT Twins, Gunpowder, and Mindstorm.

Writing
The series showrunner Eric Kripke said that the season was expected to explore deeper into the American history of the show's universe and Vought's past. He also revealed that the season would introduce the superhero team Payback: 
 Laz Alonso revealed that the season was expected to be darker than the previous seasons, stating that Soldier Boy was a pretty dark character that ensembles other Supes dark as well. In October 2020, the already finished script for the third season was revealed to get the title of "Payback", confirming that the superhero group of the same name would be making their live-action debut for the series.

One of the many superheroes introduced in the show is Soldier Boy, who serves as the leader of the superhero group "Payback". The character is described as a superhero just as dangerous as Homelander who fought in World War II, that represents the embodiment of toxic masculinity and patriotism. Kripke teases that unlike the comics where the character is portrayed as an innocent and cowardly superhero who has yearly sex with Homelander in an attempt to gain membership in the Seven, he would be portrayed as the "Homelander before Homelander" and that he would be worse than the same Homelander: 
 In the show the character is kidnapped and tortured by Russians in order to portray him as a superhero that wouldn't be the same that used to be in his time once he wakes up. Kripke made this change with the intention of making a superhero that could potentially be a dangerous rival to Homelander with almost the same strength to stand up to and fight him. Another major change from the character is that his suit would be a green one instead of the modern red, white and blue costume.

Kripke revealed that the season's sixth episode would eventually adapt the miniseries comic book Herogasm, which is centered around superhero orgy festivals. He has described the scene as a very difficult one due to the writers trying to find a way of how to make the scene fit into the storyline into the show. Jensen Ackles considered the episode to be the most traumatic experience for the crew that even the director was confused: "I know I was just kind of very curious as to how that was going to work. And even the director was like 'I don't know what I'm shooting anymore.' Our crew looked traumatized." The episode is described to be the wildest one of the show, as it intends to push several limits for a TV-MA rated show, even to the point where Chace Crawford expresses concern about the reaction of the fans and event to the point of believing that he and the rest of the crew could be canceled from the Internet.

Kripke revealed that from the storylines portrayed in the third season, he considers the character development of Kimiko as his favorite one revealing that from the beginning of the season's premiere it would begin her journey of the emotional arc she would have to explore. Kripke has stated that following the previous seasons he decided that it was finally important to give the character some agency: 

A scene of the season's premiere took inspiration from a popular theory turned viral meme of the Marvel Cinematic Universe film Avengers: Endgame when a fan suggested a possible theory of Ant-Man killing Thanos by shrinking inside the latter's rectum and expanding. However the theory was debunked by Avengers: Endgame film's co-writer Christopher Markus stating that Thanos' rectum was too strong for Ant-Man and the latter would have been killed instead. This scene is shown during the first 15 minutes of the show where Termite gets in the penis of a lover of his while making love with him but he accidentally sneezes, reverting to normal size and killing the latter. Kripke took the decision to prove that theory to give fans something that Marvel would never do:

The season includes a musical sequence taking place in a hospital between Kimiko and Frenchie, which is featured in the fifth episode "The Last Time to Look on This World of Lies", with Kripke intending to include the scene since the series second season. The episode was teased on June 14, 2022, on Twitter with the message "Bring your dancing shoes" and the hashtag #TheBoysMusical. Fukuhara deemed the scene as an opportunity to bond with Capone: "The dance rehearsals really bonded us together, and I think you can see that on-screen, as well. There's something about working on something together, like doing a team sport, that brings people together."

Casting
On August 17, 2020, it was announced that Jensen Ackles would be joining the show as Soldier Boy, promising that "the character would bring so much humor, pathos, and danger to the role." On June 7, 2021, Ackles shared through his social media his first look as the character. Laura Jean Shannon designed the suit for Soldier Boy using military green and referring to him as "the original bad-ass". She eventually explained how the suit fits his character: "Our goal was to highlight a bygone era of overt masculinity and grit. With that pedigree we dove headfirst into baking in an all-American quality grounded in a military soldier's practicality with a heavy dose of old school cowboy swagger. We knew that the actor had to have Steve McQueen looks and chops with a John Wayne attitude — luckily Jensen Ackles embodies all of that."

On October 30, 2020, it was announced that Claudia Doumit and Colby Minifie would reprise their roles as Victoria Newman and Ashley Barrett respectively with both being promoted to series regulars. On March 26, 2021, it was announced that Katia Winter joined the show as the Russian mob boss Little Nina. On June 25, 2021, Laurie Holden was announced to join the show as the superheroine and Soldier Boy's ex-girlfriend Crimson Countess. On June 23, 2021, Miles Gaston Villanueva, Sean Patrick Flannery, and Nick Wechsler joined the show respectively as Supersonic, Gunpowder, and Blue Hawk. On October 5, 2021, Frances Turner, Kristin Booth, and Jack Doolan joined the series as recurring characters. Booth and Doolan appears as the TNT twins with the former being Tessa TNT and the latter being Tommy TNT, while Turner replaced Alvina August as MM's ex-wife Monique.

Though the character originally wasn't meant to return in the season, Aya Cash reprised her role as Stormfront with a guest appearance in the season's premiere. Kripke admitted that he took the decision to bring the character back even with a small role and that even Cash was unaware of her return for the season. Antony Starr admitted that he enjoyed to work with Cash once again: "We've become really tight friends after doing season 2 together. To have her back, even just for a couple of days, was just great. She's sorely missed, but she will be forever remembered in season 3, jacking off Homelander." Charlize Theron made a surprise cameo appearance as Stormfront in the season's premiere for the trailer of the in-universe fictional film Dawn of the Seven in the same vein as her appearance in the Marvel Cinematic Universe film Doctor Strange in the Multiverse of Madness as Clea. Paul Reiser also makes an appearance in the series as The Legend, a spoof of legendary screenwriter and producer Robert Evans whereas his comics counterpart was based on Stan Lee. Kumail Nanjiani reprised his role as Vik from The Boys Presents: Diabolical in "Herogasm". Voice actor Eric Bauza voiced Buster Beaver, the mascot of Buster Beaver Pizza and a parody of Chuck E. Cheese. With the animation provided by 6 Point Harness, Bauza's former animation workplace.

Filming
On February 24, 2021, Kripke shared through his Twitter a Homelander's statue in the set of the show confirming that the production for the third season officially started in Toronto, Ontario, with the Metro Convention Centre being transformed into the fictional Vought Studios for the show. Kripke was worried that the COVID-19 could endanger the filming for the season causing conflicts with filming schedules, guest stars, and how can it work with the story. However the crew worked hard and managed to used several safety precautions to ensure the safety of every worker, something that Karl Urban acknowledged though the season was originally slated to start production in late January. On September 10, 2021, Karl Urban confirmed that the season officially wrapped filming.

Like the previous seasons, several scenes were filmed at the Roy Thomson Hall to grab the exterior of the Seven Tower with the latter one being re-created digitally. The crew filmed the Metro Toronto Convention Centre to be converted into the inside of the Vought headquarters for the series which included several posters of the supes Homelander and Starlight. The show was also filmed at several places for other scenes from the north of Downtown Toronto to Yonge Street, with a few sequences taking place at the neighborhood of Little Italy. The crew managed to capture a shot at the Flatiron Building for the apartment where the Boys are residing though the interior was probably filmed on a set at the studios. The crew filmed at the exterior of the Saint George Manor for the in-universe fictional reality show named "American Hero". The series was also filmed in Canada's Wonderland at the Medieval Faire to recreate the fictional in-universe Vought Land theme park, where Kimiko and Frenchie confront Crimson Countess.

Visual effects
The companies that were in charge of creating the visual effects for the season were Pixomondo, Rocket Science VFX, MPC Episodic, Soho VFX, Ingenuity Studios, Rising Sun Pictures, Studio 8, and Outpost VFX. Stephan Fleet was in charge of being the VFX supervisor once again after working for the previous seasons. Fleet revealed that the season would have bigger visual effects than the previous seasons but will keep the characters and story that was created by the creators of the series. Laz Alonzo revealed that the season used over three times the amount of blood more than the previous season: "I'll put it to you this way. I was talking to the head makeup artist and she's in charge of ordering the blood — that's one of her many jobs. She told me that all of Season 2... When you talk about bulk, I don't think they used over a gallon of blood in Season 2, believe it or not. Season 3, we're already at three and a half gallons of blood. So that should give you a little indication of where it's going."

For the scene where Termite gets into and subsequently blows up his lover's urethra, Brett Gredge confirmed that the crew created a 11-foot high and 30-feet long penis prosthetic (modelled after that of Seth Rogen) with a post he made at his Instagram account with a photo of himself alongside his stunt double Alex Armbruster posing in front of the fake penis covered in white powder. The show also created a fully made CGI octopus for the scene where the Deep is forced by Homelander to eat it to rejoin the Seven as the crew did not want to endanger or harm any animal. Fleet also revealed that the crew created a giant bag with white powder for the first episode where Termite in his small size is captured by Butcher into a bag full of cocaine and is taken into the custody by the Federal Bureau of Superhuman Affairs. A prosthetic animatronic octopus was created for an scene where it is seen having sex with The Deep for the sixth episode Herogasm.

Music
The soundtrack album for the soundtrack was released digitally on July 8, 2022, through Madison Gate Records. Christopher Lennertz composed the original soundtrack after previously doing so for the previous seasons.  On June 3, 2022, Madison Gate Records released its first three songs for the show written by Christopher Lennertz, with the first two being "You've Got a License to Drive (Me Crazy)" and "Rock My Kiss" both of them being performed by Miles Gaston Villanueva, while the third one was "America's Son" by Laurie Holden. On June 17, 2022, another song performed by Holden was "Chimps Don't Cry" which was released alongside its music video.

Marketing
Ahead of the third season's premiere, Amazon announced that the series would be releasing video segments of the series in the form of in-universe news reports from the Vought News Network channel on YouTube called "Seven on 7." The video segments were released on the seventh day of each month over a period of seven months starting in July 2021 and concluding in January 2022. The video segments serves as a bridge between season 2 and 3, with each segment containing different stories that tease a series of events expected to happen on upcoming episodes and introducing new characters. Matthew Edison joined the show as news anchor Cameron Coleman, a role that he would reprise at the series third season.

On March 10, 2022, a teaser poster was released through Twitter which consists of Butcher getting heat vision and featured a caption "Soon, it'll be time to level the playing field," suggesting that the character would be getting superpowers to be at the level of the supes to finally face them directly. A red band teaser trailer was released just two days later and confirmed officially that Butcher's superpowers would be heat vision. On May 13, 2022, released a teaser themed poster for the in-universe fictional film Payback with every member of the superhero group in it with Soldier Boy at the front and center of the poster and the other members being Crimson Countess, TNT (Tommy & Tessa), Mindstorm, Airburst, Gunpowder, and Black Noir.

On May 16, 2022, the official trailer for the season was released, which teased the introduction of a Compound V that grants superpowers for only 24 hours better known as V24, which revealed to be the source of Butcher's superpowers. On May 21, 2022, Amazon published a trailer for the in-universe fictional movie Dawn of the Seven which also named it as the Bourke Cut making reference to the film Zack Snyder's Justice League. A website www.dawnoftheseven.com  which gives users the details for the fictional film was also created as part of the in-universe viral marketing. Posters were also released with the main poster being designed by Kyle Lambert who also worked for the posters of Stranger Things, with the others being individual posters for each of five members of the Seven which are Homelander, Starlight, Black Noir, Queen Maeve, and A-Train. On May 30, 2022, on Twitter it was posted a 1980s themed anti-drug campaign short video with Jensen Ackles portraying Soldier Boy making reference at the Just Say No campaign. The following day it was published the in-universe outtakes of Soldier Boy revealing the true colors of the character as an hypocrital short-tempered, foul-mouthed, alcoholic and drug-addicted superhero.

Release
The third season of The Boys premiered on Amazon Prime Video its first three episodes on June 3, 2022, while the rest of the episodes set to be released on a weekly basis until July 8. Due to the graphic imagery of an orgy that was expected for the episode, the season's sixth episode "Herogasm" includes a warning sign on a trailer that was released on Twitter that reads: "This episode depicts a massive supe orgy, airborne penetration, dildo-based maiming, extra strength lube, icicle phalluses and cursing. It's not suitable for any audience."

Reception

Critical response
On Rotten Tomatoes, the third season holds an approval rating of 98% based on 144 reviews, with an average rating of 8.05/10. The website's critical consensus reads, "Managing to up the ante on what was already one of television's most audacious satires, The Boys''' third season is both bracingly visceral and wickedly smart." On Metacritic, the season has a weighted average score of 77 out of 100, based on 20 critics, indicating "generally favorable reviews".

Alison Foreman of The A.V. Club graded the season an "A-" and wrote: "Packed with fun-as-ever action, surprise cameos, and searingly salient commentary, The Boys season three ticks nearly all the boxes for those seeking on-screen catharsis amid real-world frustration, impatience, and grief." The Guardian Lucy Mangan rated the season with a 4 out of 5 stars and said: "[The Boys] goes from strength to strength. Between the actors, the writers or the viewers, it's hard to say who's having the most fun." Jennifer Bisset from CNET praised the show for its meta humor and character development and commented: "Every episode guarantees early Game of Thrones level fornication and bloodshed -- albeit the gory bits have a cartoonish CGI sheen. Even the Soldier Boy coverup storyline echoes the season 2 Stormfront mystery. Thankfully, as always, The Boys finds its sweet spot. It does so via characters more identifiable and conflicted than even the most ground-level Disney Plus heroes." Sam Stone from CBR was positive towards the series and said: "Three seasons in, and The Boys has more than earned its place as one of the best superhero television series of all time and as one of the finest original shows running on Prime Video. Obviously still not for the faint of heart, the superhero satire returns for its third season angrier and more direct than ever, with blood and gore running wholesale as its brutal characters continue to run amuck."

Inkoo Kang from The Washington Post praised the show for its themes and performances and suggested: "It's a sturdily built season, but it might make you miss the show at its full strength." Brian Lowry from the CNN commended the show for its portrayal of superheroic cynicism and performances and commented: "The Boys remains creatively fearless and, for those with the stomach for it, a great deal of fun. As creative combinations go, like Homelander, that one-two punch looks pretty near unstoppable." Joshua Rivera from Polygon praised the show for portraying real life issues such as the Trump administration and said: "This bears out — it's jarring to see direct references to things Trump said or did when he's no longer president. Fortunately, The Boys feels like a work made by people who have plenty of ammunition for both sides of the aisle, as no ideology has a monopoly on craving power — or on worshiping those who amass it." Maggie Lovitt from the website Collider rated the season with an "B+" and said: "The third season of The Boys is an insane, blood-soaked, and dick-filled journey into a twisted world where the superheroes are just as corrupt and monstrous as the government agencies that puppeteer them, and the world is ready and willing to buy into that madness and enable it."

Angie Han from The Hollywood Reporter commented on her review:  The Boys being The Boys, all these relatively nuanced ideas still culminate in a single massive, bloody battle between Supes that's more an exaggeration than a refutation of the weightless CG violence served up by any Marvel third act. And yes, it's queasily ironic that this takedown of powerful institutions is coming to us from a series funded by one of the most powerful corporations at all. But asking them feels right in line with the series-long quest to interrogate the all-American project of unthinking hero worship. The series hasn't lost its bitterness or its bite, and the chilling final shots of the finale should wipe out any fears to that effect. But as season three reminds us, the punches hit harder when there's something worth fighting for."   Jake Kleinman was positive towards the season though considered it unnecessary: "Maybe The Boys was built for Trump, and without his constant presence, it feels less necessary. Maybe Marvel is less untouchable than it was a few years ago, and The Boys'' no longer feels like a scrappy parody punching up but more like Amazon punching down."

Audience viewership
On the week of May 30 to June 5 it was reported that the third season of the show managed to get the fifth place at the Nielsen rating with over 949 million minutes of the first three episodes being watched. The following week the show suffered a drop of 30 million of viewing minutes managing to get 919 million, though it managed to be at the second place of the nielsen ratings.

Notes

References

External links
 
 

2022 American television seasons
The Boys seasons